Traveling Man is a 1989 American comedy film directed by Irvin Kershner and written by David Taylor. The film stars John Lithgow, Jonathan Silverman, Margaret Colin, John Glover, John M. Jackson and Chynna Phillips. The film premiered on HBO on June 25, 1989.

Plot
A poignant comedy about a middle-aged salesman trying to get his life and career back on track while being pushed and antagonized by an aggressive rookie he has been teamed up with.

Beset by business and marital problems, salesman Lithgow feels as though he's at the end of his rope. But it's at this point that he avoids the Willy Loman syndrome by realizing that there's more to life than a smile and a shoeshine.

Cast 
John Lithgow as Ben Cluett
Jonathan Silverman as Billy Fox
Margaret Colin as Joanna Reath
John Glover as Chick Beeler
John M. Jackson as Joe Blagdon
Chynna Phillips as Mona Voight 
Paul Armbruster as LeBeau
Dawn Arnemann as Cora
Jerry Campbell as Lydell
Marc Clement as Harry Palatka 
Saundra Dunson-Franks as Molly 
David Dwyer as Hunt
J. Don Ferguson as Riker
Jennifer Hale as Joey 
Danny Nelson as Ackerman
Bob Penny as John Parsons
Johnny Popwell as Dick Duffy
Alex Van as Buddy
Tim Ware as Harve Stratton

References

External links
 

1989 television films
1989 films
American comedy television films
1989 comedy films
HBO Films films
Films directed by Irvin Kershner
Films scored by Miles Goodman
1980s English-language films
1980s American films